Divide Independent School District is a public school district based in the community of Mountain Home in western Kerr County, Texas, United States.

In terms of students served, Divide ISD is the smallest district in Texas; the 2015 "graduation/promotion ceremony" featured a mere 11 students and the district had as few as eight students at the beginning of the 2014–2015 school year.  Divide ISD serves much of western Kerr County. Divide ISD is one of the few remaining schools called "one room schoolhouses" in the United States. Technically it is not a one-room schoolhouse according to a Texas Monthly article by Katy Vine, as the original school building – still in use – does not hold the pre-Kindergarten classes. In the original building there are two classrooms since the district divided the original single room into two.

Divide Independent School District consists of one school: Divide Elementary School, serving grades pre-Kindergarten through six. Students attend middle and high school in the neighboring Ingram Independent School District.

The school district is one of the best in the state of Texas and was rated "exemplary" by the Texas Education Agency.

History
In 1882 the Divide Common School District was established. Early in its history, the school moved according to the district's population patterns.

Fred "Barney" Klein obtained the funds to establish the school to serve an area that became populated after the state government built the relevant section of Texas State Highway 41; this school building opened in 1936, and it remained in the same location since.

The district was previously named the Divide Common School District but received its current name on July 1, 1989; on that day its ID number changed from #133‐012 to #133‐905. The district is not to be confused with the former Divide Independent School District which in 1985 became part of the Blackwell Consolidated Independent School District.

District area

Demographics
The student body varies from period and period due to the nature of employment on ranches.

Transportation
 the district uses a converted limousine purchased from a buyer in Dallas as a school bus.

See also
 Allamoore Independent School District - A former one room schoolhouse
 Juno Common School District - A former one room schoolhouse
 Non-high school district

References

Notes 

School districts in Kerr County, Texas
Public elementary schools in Texas
School districts established in 1886
1886 establishments in Texas
One-room schoolhouses in the United States